KSMO may refer to:

 The ICAO code for Santa Monica Airport
 KSMO (AM), a radio station (1340 AM) licensed to Salem, Missouri, United States
 KSMO-TV, a television station (channel 32, virtual 62) licensed to Kansas City, Missouri, United States
 KZDG, a radio station  (1550 AM) licensed to San Mateo, California, United States, which used the call letters KSMO from 1947 to 1951
 KSMO (Uganda), a notable law firm in Uganda